My Love, My Life is a compilation album released by Agnetha Fältskog, a former member of Swedish pop group ABBA, in 1996. The album is named after the ABBA song "My Love, My Life". The two-disc set primarily features Swedish-language songs recorded by Fältskog, but it also contains a few songs recorded in English, including some of her favourite ABBA songs, such as "My Love, My Life" and "The Winner Takes It All".

Track listing

Main track

Source: (disc one and two)

Bonus CD
The bonus CD was only available for a short time in Sweden.

Source:

Weekly charts

References

Agnetha Fältskog compilation albums
1996 compilation albums